Romance in Venice (German: Romanze in Venedig) is a 1962 Austrian romance film directed by Eduard von Borsody and starring Ann Smyrner, Walther Reyer and Willy Birgel.

It was shot at the Bavaria Studios in Munich and the Rosenhügel Studios in Vienna. The film's sets were designed by the art director Hans Zehetner.

Cast
 Ann Smyrner as Andrea von Bruggern 
 Walther Reyer as Stefan 
 Willy Birgel as Theodor von Bruggern 
 Annie Rosar as Barbara 
 Jane Tilden as Bettina 
 Erwin Strahl as Nikolaus 
 Olga von Togni
 Sylvia Holzmayer
 Johannes Bonaventura
 Egon von Jordan
 Josef Krastel
 Fritz Hinz-Fabricius
 Wolfgang Hebenstreit
 Oskar Wegrostek
 Herbert Fux as Servant at Villa in Venice 
 Hermann Thimig as Pfarrer

References

Bibliography 
 Bergfelder, Tim & Bock, Hans-Michael. ''The Concise Cinegraph: Encyclopedia of German. Berghahn Books, 2009.

External links 
 

1962 films
Austrian romance films
1960s romance films
1960s German-language films
Films directed by Eduard von Borsody
Bavaria Film films
Films set in Venice
Films shot at Rosenhügel Studios
Films shot at Bavaria Studios